Stevan Mirković (27 October 1927 – 26 September 2015) was a Serb general of the Yugoslav People's Army (JNA).

Biography
In 1944, during World War II in Yugoslavia, Mirković joined both the Yugoslav Partisans and the League of Communists of Yugoslavia (SKJ). He was wounded on the Syrmian Front and near Brčko. He was prompted to Major General in 1975, Lieutenant General in 1982 and Colonel General in 1987. In the 1980s, he held a number of senior positions in the Yugoslav People's Army (JNA). In 1987–1989, he held the position of the Chief of the General Staff of the JNA. He retired from active military service on 31 December 1989. However, he continued to be a member of the Organization of the League of Communists in the Yugoslav People's Army. He was a fierce critic of Slobodan Milošević, as Milošević's influence in the Socialist Republic of Serbia grew during 1989–1990.

References

Literature

1927 births
2015 deaths
Military personnel from Valjevo
Chiefs of Staff of the Yugoslav People's Army
Yugoslav Partisans members
Serbian generals
Generals of the Yugoslav People's Army
League of Communists of Serbia politicians
League of Communists – Movement for Yugoslavia politicians
Central Committee of the League of Communists of Yugoslavia members
Burials at Belgrade New Cemetery